James Nicol Grieve (July 17, 1855 – August 4, 1918) was a farmer and political figure in Ontario, Canada. He represented Perth North in the House of Commons of Canada from 1891 to 1896 as a Liberal member.

He was born in Mornington Township, Canada West, the son of Scottish immigrants. He married Ella O. F. Hutchison. He was deputy reeve for Mornington Township from 1892 to 1893. Grieve's election in 1891 was overturned on appeal but he won the subsequent by-election in 1892. He was defeated when he ran for reelection in 1896. Grieve was also a director of the Elma Fire Insurance Company and the Farmer's Institute for the North Region of Perth.

References 
 
The Canadian parliamentary companion, 1891, AJ Gemmill

1855 births
1918 deaths
Members of the House of Commons of Canada from Ontario
Liberal Party of Canada MPs